Anne de Gaulle (1 January 1928 – 6 February 1948) was the youngest daughter of General Charles de Gaulle and his wife, Yvonne. She was born in Trier, Germany, where her father was stationed with the Army of Occupation in the Rhineland.

She was born with Down syndrome and lived with her family until her death. De Gaulle's relatives all testified that the General, who was normally undemonstrative and stoic in his affections for his family, was more open and extroverted with Anne. De Gaulle would entertain her with songs, dances, and pantomimes.

In October 1945, Yvonne de Gaulle bought the Château de Vert-Cœur at Milon-la-Chapelle (Yvelines), where they installed a private hospital for disabled young girls: the Fondation Anne de Gaulle.

Anne died of pneumonia on 6 February 1948, aged 20, at Colombey-les-Deux-Églises. She could only say one word clearly: "Papa". Upon her death, her father said: "Now, she is like the others."  ("Maintenant, elle est comme les autres.")

On 22 August 1962, Charles de Gaulle was the victim of an attempted assassination at Petit-Clamart. He later said that the potentially fatal bullet had been stopped by the frame of the photograph of Anne that he always carried with him; placed this particular day on the rear shelf of his car. When he died in 1970, he was buried in the cemetery of Colombey beside his beloved daughter.

She is portrayed by Clémence Hittin in the 2020 film De Gaulle.

References

External links  

1928 births
1948 deaths
Children of national leaders of France
French people of Breton descent
People from Trier
Anne
People with Down syndrome
Deaths from pneumonia in France
People from the Rhine Province
French expatriates in Germany